Harlingen Haven (abbreviation: Hlgh) is an unstaffed railway station in Harlingen, Netherlands. The station was opened on 27 October 1863 and is the western terminus station of the Harlingen–Nieuweschans railway. The services are operated by Arriva. Ferry services to Vlieland and Terschelling depart from near the station. 600m east of this station is Harlingen station.

Train services

Bus services

See also
 List of railway stations in Friesland

References

External links
  Station Harlingen Haven, station information
 

Railway stations in Friesland
Railway stations on the Staatslijn B
Railway stations opened in 1863
Harlingen, Netherlands